The 2016–17 I-League 2nd Division Final Round was the final round of 2016–17 I-League 2nd Division. Manipur team NEROCA F.C. won the title and promoted to I-League.

Teams

Stadiums and locations
Note: Table lists in alphabetical order.

Table

Fixtures and results

See also
 2016–17 I-League
 2016–17 I-League 2nd Division
 2016–17 I-League U18 Final Round

References

External links
 Official website

I-League 2nd Division final rounds
I-League 2nd Division